Meaghan Francella (born May 12, 1982) is an American professional golfer currently playing on the LPGA Tour.

Early life and amateur career
Francella was born in Port Chester, New York and was twice the New York State Junior Champion. She attended high school at the School of the Holy Child in Rye, New York. After high school, she attended the University of Memphis, where she was named Conference USA Freshman of the Year in 2001. Francella transferred to the University of North Carolina for her junior year. While at North Carolina she was the 2003 Atlantic Coast Conference individual champion and was an NCAA First-Team All-American in 2004. Francella graduated with a degree in communications in 2005.

Professional career
After completing her college eligibility in 2004, Francella joined the Futures Tour. She finished 65th at the 2005 LPGA Qualifying School to earn non-exempt status for the 2006 season. In 2006, she made three starts on the LPGA Tour, making one cut. On the Futures Tour, she won one event, the Lakeland Duramed FUTURES Classic, and recorded six additional top-10 finishes. She ended the season fifth on the Futures Tour money list which earned her fully exempt status on the LPGA Tour for 2007.

Francella's first win on the LPGA Tour came in her second start of 2007 at the MasterCard Classic, where she scored 68-68-69 with only two bogies over the three-round tournament and then held off world number one Annika Sörenstam in a four-hole playoff.

Professional wins (3)

LPGA Tour wins (1)

LPGA Tour playoff record (1–0)

Futures Tour wins (1)
2006 (1) Lakeland Duramed Futures Classic

Other wins (1)
2010 (1) HSBC LPGA Brasil Cup (unofficial event on the LPGA Tour)

Results in LPGA majors

^ The Evian Championship was added as a major in 2013.

CUT = missed the half-way cut
T = tied

LPGA Tour career summary

 Official through November 24, 2013

* Includes matchplay and other events without a cut.

References

External links

Meaghan Francella official blog

American female golfers
Memphis Tigers women's golfers
LPGA Tour golfers
Golfers from New York (state)
North Carolina Tar Heels women's golfers
People from Port Chester, New York
1982 births
Living people